Let Them Eat Rock is a 2004 documentary film by Rodman Flender that follows five eventful years in the Boston-based rock band The Upper Crust.

Flender began filming the band in 1997.  He put the project on hold to direct the horror-comedy movie Idle Hands.  When he returned to finish editing, guitarist and singer Edward L. Widmer had left the group to become a speechwriter in the Clinton White House.  Flender started shooting again to include this turn of events.  The documentary played film festivals in 2005 and 2006 to mostly positive notices.

References

External links

2004 films
American documentary films
Films directed by Rodman Flender
Rockumentaries
2000s English-language films
2000s American films